Whitley Branch is a stream in the U.S. state of Georgia. It is a tributary to Stitchihatchie Creek.

It is unknown why the name "Whitley Branch" was applied to this stream. A variant name is "Miller's Branch".

References

Rivers of Georgia (U.S. state)
Rivers of Laurens County, Georgia